The Baltimore Sun is the largest general-circulation daily newspaper based in the U.S. state of Maryland and provides coverage of local and regional news, events, issues, people, and industries.

Founded in 1837, it is currently owned by Tribune Publishing. The Baltimore Sun's parent company, Tribune Publishing, was acquired by Alden Global Capital, which operates its media properties through Digital First Media, in May 2021.

History
The Sun was founded on May 17, 1837, by printer/editor/publisher/owner Arunah Shepherdson Abell (often listed as "A. S. Abell") and two associates, William Moseley Swain, and Azariah H. Simmons, recently from Philadelphia, where they had started and published the Public Ledger the year before. Abell was born in Rhode Island, became a journalist with the Providence Patriot and later worked with newspapers in New York City and Boston.

The Abell family and descendants owned The Sun until 1910, when the local Black and Garrett families invested in the paper at the suggestion of former rival owner/publisher of The News, Charles H. Grasty, and they, along with Grasty gained a controlling interest; they retained the name A. S. Abell Company for the parent publishing company. That same year The Evening Sun was established under reporter, editor/columnist H.L. Mencken (1880–1956). From 1947 to 1986, The Sun was the owner and founder of Maryland's first television station, WMAR-TV (channel 2), which was a longtime affiliate of CBS until 1981, when it switched to NBC. The station was sold off in 1986, and is now owned by the E. W. Scripps Company, and has been an ABC affiliate since 1995. A. S. Abell also owned several radio stations, but not in Baltimore itself (holding construction permits for WMAR sister AM/FM stations, but never bringing them to air).

The newspaper opened its first foreign bureau in London in 1924. Between 1955 and 1961, it added four new foreign offices. As Cold War tensions grew, it set up shop in Bonn, West Germany, in February 1955. (The bureau later moved to Berlin.) Eleven months later, The Sun opened a Moscow bureau, becoming one of the first U.S. newspapers to do so. A Rome office followed in July 1957, and in 1961, The Sun expanded to New Delhi. At its height, The Sun ran eight foreign bureaus, giving rise to its boast in a 1983 advertisement that "The Sun never sets on the world."

The paper was sold by Reg Murphy in 1986 to the Times-Mirror Company of the Los Angeles Times. The same week, a 115 year old rivalry ended. The oldest paper in the city, the News American, a Hearst paper since the 1920s, but with roots to 1773, folded. A decade later in 1997, The Sun acquired the Patuxent Publishing Company, a local suburban newspaper publisher that had a stable of 15 weekly papers and a few magazines in several communities and counties.

In the 1990s and 2000s, The Sun began cutting back its foreign coverage. In 1995 and 1996, the paper closed its Tokyo, Mexico City and Berlin bureaus. Two more—Beijing and London—fell victim to cost-cutting in 2005. The final three foreign bureaus—Moscow, Jerusalem, and Johannesburg, South Africa—fell a couple of years later. All were closed by 2008, as the Tribune Co. streamlined and downsized the newspaper chain's foreign reporting. Some material from The Suns foreign correspondents is archived at the University of Maryland, Baltimore County.

In the 21st century, The Sun, like most legacy newspapers in the United States, has suffered a number of setbacks in the competition with Internet and other sources, including a decline in readership and ads, a shrinking newsroom staff, and competition in 2005 from The Baltimore Examiner, a free daily that lasted two years to 2007, along with a similar Washington publication of a small chain recently started by new owners that took over the old Hearst flagship paper, the San Francisco Examiner. In 2000, the Times-Mirror company was purchased by the Tribune Company of Chicago. In 2014, it transferred its newspapers, including The Sun, to Tribune Publishing.

On September 19, 2005, and again on August 24, 2008, The Baltimore Sun as the paper now titled itself, introduced new layout designs. Its circulation  was 195,561 for the daily edition and 343,552 on Sundays. On April 29, 2009, the Tribune Company announced that it would lay off 61 of the 205 staff members in the Sun newsroom. On September 23, 2011, it was reported that the Baltimore Sun would be moving its web edition behind a paywall starting October 10, 2011.

The Baltimore Sun is the flagship of the Baltimore Sun Media Group, which also produces the b free daily newspaper and more than 30 other Baltimore metropolitan-area community newspapers, magazines and Web sites. BSMG content reaches more than one million Baltimore-area readers each week and is the region's most widely read source of news.

On February 20, 2014, The Baltimore Sun Media Group announced that they would buy the alternative weekly City Paper. In April, the Sun acquired the Maryland publications of Landmark Media Enterprises.

In February 2021, as part of the planned merger between Tribune Publishing and Alden Global Capital, Tribune announced that Alden had reached a non-binding agreement to sell The Sun to the Sunlight For All Institute, a nonprofit backed by businessman and philanthropist Stewart W. Bainum Jr. The deal is contingent on the approval of the merger by Tribune shareholders.

In February, 2022, the editorial board of The Sun published a lengthy apology for its racism over its 185–year history, including specific offenses such as accepting classified ads for selling enslaved people and publishing editorials that promoted racial segregation and disenfranchisement of Black voters.

Editions
From 1910 to 1995 there were two distinct newspapers—The Sun in the morning and The Evening Sun in the afternoon—each with its own separate reporting and editorial staff. The Evening Sun was first published in 1910 under the leadership of Charles H. Grasty, former owner of the Evening News, and a firm believer in the evening circulation. For most of its existence, The Evening Sun led its morning sibling in circulation. In 1959, the afternoon edition's circulation was 220,174, compared to 196,675 for the morning edition. However, by the 1980s, cultural, technological and economic shifts in America were eating away at afternoon newspapers' market share, with readers flocking to either morning papers or switching to nightly television news broadcasts. In 1992, the afternoon paper's circulation was 133,800. By mid-1995, The Evening Suns readership—86,360—had been eclipsed by The Sun—264,583. The Evening Sun ceased publication on September 15, 1995.

Daily
After a period of roughly a year during which the paper's owners sometimes printed a two-section product, The Baltimore Sun now has three sections every weekday: News, Sports and alternating various business and features sections. On some days, comics and such features as the horoscope and TV listings are printed in the back of the Sports section. After dropping the standalone business section in 2009, The Sun brought back a business section on Tuesdays and Sundays in 2010, with business pages occupying part of the news section on other days. Features sections debuting in 2010 included a Saturday "Home" section, a Thursday "Style" section and a Monday section called "Sunrise." The sports article written by Peter Schmuck is published only on weekdays.

Sunday
The Sunday Sun for many years was noted for a locally produced rotogravure Maryland pictorial magazine section, featuring works by such acclaimed photographers as A. Aubrey Bodine. The Sunday Sun dropped the Sunday Sun Magazine in 1996 and now only carries Parade magazine weekly. A quarterly version of the Sun Magazine was resurrected in September 2010, with stories that included a comparison of young local doctors, an interview with actress Julie Bowen and a feature on the homes of a former Baltimore anchorwoman. Newsroom managers plan to add online content on a more frequent basis.

baltimoresun.com
The company introduced its website in September 1996. A redesign of the site was unveiled in June 2009, capping a six-month period of record online traffic. Each month from January through June, an average of 3.5 million unique visitors combined to view 36.6 million Web pages. Sun reporters and editors produce more than three dozen blogs on such subjects as technology, weather, education, politics, Baltimore crime, real estate, gardening, pets and parenting. Among the most popular are Dining@Large, which covers local restaurants; The Schmuck Stops Here, a Baltimore-centric sports blog written by Peter Schmuck; Z on TV, by media critic David Zurawik; and Midnight Sun, a nightlife blog. A Baltimore Sun iPhone app was released September 14, 2010.

b
In 2008, the Baltimore Sun Media Group launched the daily paper b to target younger and more casual readers, ages 18 to 35. It was in tabloid format, with large graphics, creative design, and humor in focusing on entertainment, news, and sports. Its companion website was bthesite.com. The paper transitioned from daily to weekly publication in 2011. It ceased publication entirely in August 2015, more than a year after the Baltimore Sun Media Group acquired City Paper.

Contributors
The Baltimore Sun has been home to many notable journalists, including reporter, essayist, and language scholar H.L. Mencken, who had a forty-plus-year association with the paper. Other notable journalists, editors, photographers and cartoonists on the staff of Sun papers include Rafael Alvarez, Linda Carter Brinson, Richard Ben Cramer, Russell Baker, A. Aubrey Bodine, John Carroll, James Grant, Turner Catledge, Edmund Duffy, Thomas Edsall, John Filo, Jon Franklin, Jack Germond, Mauritz A. Hallgren, Price Day, Phil Potter, David Hobby, Brit Hume, Gwen Ifill, Gerald W. Johnson, Kevin P. Kallaugher (KAL), Murray Kempton, Frank Kent, Tim Kurkjian, Laura Lippman, William Manchester, Lee McCardell, sportscaster Jim McKay, Kay Mills, Robert Mottar, Reg Murphy, Thomas O'Neill, Drew Pearson, Ken Rosenthal, Louis Rukeyser, Dan Shaughnessy, David Simon, Michael Sragow, John Steadman, Jules Witcover, and William F. Zorzi. The paper has won 16 Pulitzer Prizes.

Facilities

The first issue of The Sun, a four-page tabloid, was printed at 21 Light Street in downtown Baltimore in the mid-1830s. A five-story structure, at the corner of Baltimore and South streets, was built in 1851. The "Iron Building", as it was called, was destroyed in the Great Baltimore Fire of 1904.

In 1906, operations were moved to Charles and Baltimore streets, where The Sun was written, published and distributed for nearly 50 years. In 1950, the operation was moved to a larger, modern plant at Calvert and Centre streets. In 1979, ground was broken for a new addition to the Calvert Street plant to house modern pressroom facilities. The new facility commenced operations in 1981.

In April 1988, at a cost of $180 million, the company purchased  of land at Port Covington and built "Sun Park". The new building houses a satellite printing and packaging facility, as well as the distribution operation. The Suns printing facility at Sun Park has highly sophisticated computerized presses and automated insertion equipment in the packaging area. To keep pace with the speed of the presses and Automated Guided Vehicles; "intelligent" electronic forklifts deliver the newsprint to the presses.

On Sunday, January 30, 2022, The Baltimore Sun newspaper was printed for the last time at its Sun Park facility. It was reported that The Sun's printing operations would be moved to a printing facility in Wilmington, Delaware.

In 1885, The Sun constructed a building for its Washington Bureau at 1317 F Street, NW. The building is on the National Register.

Controversies
 The paper became embroiled in a controversy involving the former governor of Maryland, Robert L. Ehrlich Jr. (R). Ehrlich had issued an executive order on November 18, 2004, banning state executive branch employees from talking to Sun columnist Michael Olesker and reporter David Nitkin, claiming that their coverage had been unfair to the administration. This led The Sun to file a First Amendment lawsuit against the Ehrlich administration. The case was dismissed by a U.S. District Court judge, and The Sun appealed to the 4th U.S. Circuit Court of Appeals, which upheld the dismissal.
 The same Olesker was forced to resign on January 4, 2006, after being accused of plagiarism. The Baltimore City Paper reported that several of his columns contained sentences or paragraphs that were extremely similar (although not identical) to material previously published in The Washington Post, The New York Times, and The Sun. Several of his colleagues both in and out of the paper were highly critical of the forced resignation, taking the view that the use of previously published boilerplate material was common newsroom practice, and Olesker's alleged plagiarism was in line with that practice.
 Between 2006 and 2007, Thomas Andrews Drake, a former National Security Agency executive, allegedly leaked classified information to Siobhan Gorman, then a national security reporter for The Sun. Drake was charged in April 2010 with 10 felony counts in relation to the leaks. In June 2011, all 10 original charges were dropped, in what was widely viewed as an acknowledgement that the government had no valid case against the whistleblower, who eventually pleaded to one misdemeanor count for exceeding authorized use of a computer. Drake was the 2011 recipient of the Ridenhour Prize for Truth-Telling.
 Entering an ongoing controversy labeled as racist attacks by Donald Trump against congressional members who had criticized him that had begun to include numerous attacks against Baltimore Congressman Elijah Cummings and was naming him personally responsible for the presence of rodents in Baltimore neighborhoods, on July 27, 2019, The Baltimore Sun responded with an editorial entitled, "Better to have a few rats than to be one".
 In 2018, in response to the European cookie law, baltimoresun.com began blocking visitors with European IP addresses rather than go to the effort of obtaining permission-requesting software, with the result that many European visitors (and those from some non-European countries) must visit the site via proxies, potentially muddling the website's analytics.

Portrayal in The Wire
The Baltimore Sun was featured in the American crime drama television series The Wire in 2008 (season 5), which was created by former Sun reporter David Simon.

Like all of the institutions featured in The Wire, the Sun is portrayed as having many deeply dysfunctional qualities while also having very dedicated people on its staff. The season focuses on the role of the media in affecting political decisions in City Hall and the priorities of the Baltimore Police Department. Additionally, the show explores the business pressures of modern media through layoffs and buyouts occurring at the Sun, on the orders of the Tribune Company, the Suns corporate owner.

One storyline involves a troubled Sun reporter named Scott Templeton, and his escalating tendency to sensationalize and falsify stories. The Wire portrays the managing editors of the Sun as turning a blind eye to the protests of a concerned line editor, in the managing editors' zeal to win a Pulitzer Prize. The show insinuates that the motivation for this institutional dysfunction is the business pressures of modern media, and working for a flagship newspaper in a major media market like The New York Times or The Washington Post is seen as the only way to avoid the cutbacks occurring at the Sun.

Season 5 was The Wires last. The finale episode, "-30-", features a montage at the end portraying the ultimate fate of the major characters. It shows Templeton at Columbia University with the senior editors of the fictional Sun, accepting the Pulitzer Prize, with no mention being made as to the aftermath of Templeton's career. Alma Gutierrez is shown being exiled to the Carroll County bureau past the suburbs.

News partnership
In September 2008, The Baltimore Sun became the newspaper partner of station WJZ-TV, owned and operated by CBS; the partnership involves sharing content and story leads, and teaming up on stories. WJZ promotes Baltimore Sun stories in its news broadcasts. The Sun promotes WJZ's stories and weather team on its pages.

See also

 :Category:The Baltimore Sun people
 List of newspapers in Maryland
 List of newspapers in the United States by circulation
 Media in Baltimore

References

Further reading
 
 
 Merrill, John C. and Harold A. Fisher. The world's great dailies: profiles of fifty newspapers (1980) pp 73–80

External links

 
 
 Baltimore Sun Archives at the University of Maryland, Baltimore County
 Baltimore Sun online archives (1837 to present)
 Rasmussen, Frederick N. "Sun vignette has been greeting readers since 1837," The Baltimore Sun, Monday, May 17, 2010.
 Telling Our Stories (memories of former employees)
 
 * 
 
“Baltimore Sun, 150 Years Of,” 1987-05-17, Maryland Public Television, The Walter J. Brown Media Archives & Peabody Awards Collection at the University of Georgia, American Archive of Public Broadcasting
 Final Sun Park press run on January 30, 2022 | PHOTOS
 Baltimore Sun Media prints in Sun Park for last time on January 30, 2022 | VIDEO

1837 establishments in Maryland
Companies that filed for Chapter 11 bankruptcy in 2008
Newspapers published in Baltimore
Newspapers established in 1837
Pulitzer Prize for Public Service winners
Pulitzer Prize-winning newspapers
Tribune Publishing
Pulitzer Prize for Local Reporting winners